Eran Elinav (born 22 June 1969 in Jerusalem, Israel) is an Israeli immunologist and microbiota researcher at the Weizmann Institute of Science and the DKFZ. 

He is an international scholar at the Howard Hughes Medical Institute (HHMI) and the Bill & Melinda Gates Foundation and a senior fellow of the Canadian Institute for Advance Research (CIFAR).

Academic and medical career 

Elinav earned a M.D. from the Hebrew University in Jerusalem in 1999. Following an internship and residency in internal medicine at the Hadassah-Hebrew University Medical Center in 2000–2004.

He served as a senior physician-scientist at the Tel Aviv Sourasky Medical Center Institute of Gastroenterology and Liver Disease in 2005–2009.

In 2009 Elinav earned a Ph.D. in immunology from the Weizmann Institute of Science, advised by Zelig Eshhar, after developing the Chimeric Antigen Receptor Regulatory T cell (CAR-Treg) approach, as treatment of inflammatory bowel disease and autoimmunity. In 2009-2012 he 
followed by a post-doc at Yale University, advised by Richard Anthony Flavell, in which he discovered the NLRP6 inflammasome.

In 2012 Elinav moved to the Weizmann Institute of Science and in 2016 was made a professor.
He heads the Institute of Microbiome research and the Center of Host-Pathogen Interaction Research at the Weizmann Institute of Science and the Microbiome & Cancer Division at the DKFZ.

Research
Elinav studies the molecular basis of host-microbiota interactions, and their effects of diet, environmental factors, immune function and host genetics on the intestinal microbiome and associated multi-factorial metabolic, inflammatory, malignant and neurogenerative disease.
His most-cited papers have more than 2,000 cites each.

Elinav developed precision microbiota interventions, including Personalized Nutrition, Precision Probiotics, small molecule ″postbiotics″, Phage Therapy,  autologous fecal microbiome transplantation, Vaginal Microbiome Transplantation (VMT)  and gut epithelial interventions.

Personalized Nutrition 
Elinav discovered that people consuming identical foods and additives, such as non-nutritive sweeteners, general foods and bread, feature a unique and personalized glycemic response, thereby potentially explaining the lack of uniform metabolic responses to generalized dietary approaches. Personalized dietary recommendations, based on individualized dietary, clinical and microbiota data, improved pre-diabetes control. He similarly showed, that consumption of probiotics leads to a person-specific colonization resistance and physiological patterns.

Nutritional timing and the Microbiota 
Elinav discovered, that the gut microbiota  features a compositional and functional diurnal activity during a 24-hour cycle, which is dictated by host and environmental factors, mainly by the timing in food consumption.  These microbiota diurnal activities are tightly coordinated with the host gastrointestinal and systemic circadian activity, while disruption of circadian activity by jet-lag or shift work may lead to alterations in the microbiota behavior, which contribute to the development of common metabolic, immune and liver diseases.

Awards and recognition
Elinav was awarded the Rappaport prize for biomedical research in 2015, the Levinson award for basic science research in 2016, the Landau prize of Immunology in 2018 and was inducted to the American Academy of Microbiology in 2021.

References 

Scientists from Jerusalem
Academic staff of Weizmann Institute of Science
Israeli immunologists
Weizmann Institute of Science alumni
The Hebrew University-Hadassah Medical School alumni
Bill & Melinda Gates Foundation people
1969 births
Living people
Fellows of the American Academy of Microbiology